Warren Barker (April 16, 1923 – August 3, 2006) was an American composer, arranger, and conductor known for work in film, radio, and television, as well as for original band and symphonic compositions.

Education 
He attended the University of California, Los Angeles., where he studied with several noted composers. Additionally, he studied with noted Italian composer and pianist Mario Castelnuovo-Tedesco and Henri Pensis, the composer, violinist, and founder and first conductor of the Luxembourg Philharmonic Orchestra. In 1943, he joined the United States Army Air Forces and was first sergeant of a 28-piece band, coordinating musical activities.  His duties in the military included composing and arranging for radio programs, stage shows, war bond tours, and military functions.

Career 
After the war, Barker became chief arranger for the noted Hollywood composer, Carmen Dragon. For the next 25 years, Barker worked in Hollywood, in radio, movies, and in the then-new medium of television. At the age of 24 he was appointed chief arranger for NBC's The Railroad Hour, a position he held for six years. He composed, arranged, and conducted music for many motion pictures and television shows, being associated with 20th Century Fox, Columbia, and MGM studios. He was a member of the arranging staff for the movie version of Hello Dolly!

A highlight of Barker's work in television was seven years as composer-conductor for the highly rated comedy series, Bewitched. The National Academy of Television Arts and Sciences (the "Emmys") honored Barker in 1970 for his original music written for the award-winning series, My World and Welcome to It, in which Barker was the first composer to use Robert Moog's synthesizer in a major television show.

With the Warren Barker Orchestra, Barker served as conductor-arranger and a recording artist for Warner Bros. Records and Capitol Records. His recording work is still available. Barker's compositions and arrangements have been performed and recorded by a variety of musical artists, including Frank Sinatra, where Barker worked with his lifelong colleague and friend, Nelson Riddle.At the end of the 1950s, he served as musical director and conductor on the soundtrack album 77 Sunset Strip. His recordings crossed pop and jazz genres and included unique arrangements and inclusions of folk music from around the world, including an album produced with actor William Holden, A Musical Touch of Far Away Places (1959). His original work included a fascinating and challenging jazz piece, Scherzo for Saxophone Quartet.

In 1971, Barker retired from work in Hollywood and went into the ranching business. In 1975 he was coaxed out of retirement and asked to compose and arrange music for music publisher Hal Leonard Corporation. From that point until just before his death, he was in high demand as a composer, arranger, and conductor, associated with numerous major publishers and commissioned by bands and orchestras around the world, often conducting the premier of a composition. His commissions came from the major bands of most of the U.S. armed services, military bands and orchestras in other countries, and from orchestras at universities and elsewhere in the U.S.

Compositions 
Barker composed and arranged for numerous bands and orchestras, including in his earlier years, the Hollywood Bowl and Cincinnati Pops orchestras.

Orchestral 

 1989: Overture a la Russe

References

External links

1923 births
2006 deaths
20th-century American composers
20th-century American male musicians
American film score composers
American television composers
Bewitched
American male film score composers
Male television composers
Musicians from Oakland, California
UCLA School of the Arts and Architecture alumni
Warner Records artists
United States Army Air Forces personnel of World War II
United States Army Air Forces non-commissioned officers